Lauca National Park is located in Chile's far north, in the Andean range. It encompasses an area of 1,379 km2 of altiplano and mountains, the latter consisting mainly of enormous volcanoes. Las Vicuñas National Reserve is its neighbour to the south. Both protected areas, along with Salar de Surire Natural Monument, form Lauca Biosphere Reserve. The park borders Sajama National Park in Bolivia.

Position

Geography
One of the main attractions of the park is the small lacustrine area formed by Chungará and Cotacotani lakes, which lies at the foothills of the Payachata volcanic group. Other majestic volcanoes forming part of the national park are the Guallatiri and the Acotango. Lauca features include archaeological sites, lava fields and volcanic calderas. Within the park is located the town of Parinacota with its colonial church.

The headwaters of Lauca River are also found within the park and bordering it to the west is Lluta River.

The international Chile Route 11 passes through this protected area. It runs from Chile Route 5 in the vicinity of Arica to Tambo Quemado Pass and provides the main access to the park.

Biology
The park lies within the Central Andean dry puna ecoregion.

Several species of animals and plants can be found in the park. Mammals in the area include vicuñas, llamas, alpacas, guanacos, tarucas, cougars and vizcachas.

There are over 140 bird species, making it one of the best national parks for birding in Chile. Those include puna ibis, Andean goose, giant coot, puna tinamou, silvery grebe, crested duck, puna teal, Andean condor and Chilean flamingo.

Over 400 species of vascular plants grow in Lauca National Park. The park's vegetation is adapted to the harsh puna environment, as are the bofedales, llaretales and Andean steppes.

References
Citations

Bibliography
 Parque Nacional Lauca
World Database on Protected Areas entry

External links
WCMC Site Sheet (Aug. 1990)

National parks of Chile
Protected areas established in 1970
Protected areas of Arica y Parinacota Region